Jules Flandrin (1871–1947) was a French painter, printer and draughtsman, born at Corenc, near Grenoble, on 9 July 1871.  He was a pupil of Gustave Moreau.  He was a contemporary of Henri Matisse, Georges Rouault, Albert Marquet, Henri Evenepoel and Léon Printemps.  He became somewhat famous for being fairly conformist early in his career but later in life he made more emotional and less widely known art.  His experiences during World War I shaped the rest of his life and artistic career. He was awarded the Légion d'honneur in 1912.

He is buried at Saint Roch Cemetery in Grenoble.

References

Further reading

19th-century French painters
French male painters
20th-century French painters
20th-century French male artists
French draughtsmen
Recipients of the Legion of Honour
1871 births
1947 deaths
20th-century French printmakers
19th-century French male artists